Chet Edward "Ed" Cunningham is an American lawyer and CEO. He has been involved in politics, serving as a member of President Barack Obama's National Finance Committee, the Presidential Advisory Committee (Technology), the U.S. Foreign Affairs Budget Project Advisory Committee, the American Academy of Diplomacy (Co-Director of International Negotiations Program), and the Democratic National Committee National Advisory Board.

Biography

Early life and education
Cunningham grew up in a small West Texas town with a population of fewer than 1,000 people. He played football for the University of Texas football team where he earned All-American honors and was voted the team's Most Valuable Player. In addition, he received one of the University’s highest honors, the D. Harold Byrd Leadership Award. Before attending Texas Tech University School of Law, Cunningham had brief stints in the NFL with the New York Giants and Cleveland Browns.

Career
Cunningham was a partner and Director for the Global Media, Sports and Entertainment Practice at the Coudert Brothers law firm. It was the first and, during Cunningham’s tenure, the largest international law firm in Asia (more than 1,000 attorneys). In addition to representing many of the world's largest or most notable companies, Cunningham has served as an adviser and international counsel for Asian municipalities, provinces, and national government entities and officials.

Cunningham next served as the Asia CEO for Clear Channel Communications (Entertainment Division), a Fortune 500 Company. Cunningham worked with government leaders and companies to create China's earliest joint ventures in the politically sensitive cultural, sports, entertainment, and media industries.

As AEG's Chief Executive Officer, Managing Director and Special Advisor for Asia (2005-April 2009), Cunningham was responsible for the region's development. That included building AEG's global platform through agreements to develop media, culture, sports, and entertainment in the region's major cities, including the 2008 Beijing Olympic Basketball Arena and the 2010 World Expo Arena.

Cunningham founded and organized the China Earthquake Tent Relief Project to supply shelter for the earthquake victims in China's Sichuan Province, which provided the first foreign-supplied tents to the area.

Relationships
Cunningham was formerly married to Tara Coronado with whom he has four children. He has been married to Aimee Cunningham since 2014.

References

Year of birth missing (living people)
Living people
American chief executives
Businesspeople from Texas
Texas Longhorns football players
Texas Tech University School of Law alumni
University of Texas at Austin alumni
American lawyers
Players of American football from Texas